The 1938 Auckland Rugby League season was its 30th. Marist Old Boys won their 3rd first grade title with their previous coming in 1924 and 1931.

Richmond Rovers won the Roope Rooster for the 5th time when they beat City Rovers 20–8 in the final. City had not won a trophy since 1925 but had been boosted mid season by the addition of Bob Banham who the Auckland Rugby League had brought over from Australia as a player coach. Richmond also won the Stormont Shield for the 4th time when they defeated Marist Old Boys 9–8. Eastern Suburbs (NSWRL runner up) toured at the end of the season and Richmond were the only team to beat them when they won 11–9. Eastern Suburbs beat Marist (36-15), Manukau (16-7) and a South Auckland (Waikato) team (17-5).

Manukau, who were coached by former Kiwi Bert Laing won the Phelan Shield for the first time after they beat Papakura18-8 in the final. The Phelan Shield at this time was played for by the teams which had been knocked out of the Roope Rooster. Richmond Rovers won the reserve grade competition (Norton Cup) after they were tied with Mount Albert United after the final round and a final was necessary to decide the champion. Richmond won the match 16–10. They also won the Stallard Cup when they won the reserve grade knockout competition beating Marist 18–7 in the final. The Senior B competition (Sharman Cup) was comfortably won by Otahuhu Rovers who finished 5 competition points ahead of Green Lane. Ellerslie United won the Walmesley Shield which was the senior B knockout competition although this season it was played over 2 full rounds.

Claude Dempsey, the Newton fullback, and former NZ international player was awarded the J.F.W. Dickson's medal for being the most sportsmanlike player in the senior grade. Junior awards went to J. Means and J. McWilliams.

The representative season saw Auckland play three matches. They defeated a Rest of the North Island side easily by 67 points to 14. They then beat the returning New Zealand team which had toured Australia by 21 points to 13. Then in August they defeated Canterbury 28–22 at Carlaw Park. The North Island team which beat the South Island was dominated by Auckland players with only Joe Cootes (Wellington) being from outside Auckland. They thrashed the South Island 55 points to 2. Unsurprisingly 18 of the New Zealand team selected to tour Australia were Auckland players. The Auckland Māori team played just one match which was against an Auckland Pākehā side and ran out 26 to 21 winners.

Auckland Rugby League meeting and news

Preliminary meeting
At a meeting on February 17 the Auckland Rugby League decided to start the senior competition at the early date on April 2 due to the tour of New Zealand to Australia during the season. The date for the annual meeting was set at March 23. At the conclusion of the meeting they inspected the new lighting which has been installed at Carlaw Park in order to accommodate night football.

Annual general meeting
The report which was to be presented at the annual general meeting showed that the balance sheet for the Auckland Rugby League was £3605s at the end of the 1937 season which was an increase of £21 on the previous season. There was an excess of assets over liabilities of £7598 12s 9d. At the annual meeting on March 23 Mr. John A. Lee presided as president. He said "last year the code made great progress... and we are opening the greatest season we have ever had. Co-operation and good spirit shown by players and officials was to a large degree responsible for this success... after years of difficultly last year we reached the strength to warrant a team being sent and tested on the playing fields of Australia... great responsibility rests with the officials to see that a fine team be sent this season". He went on to declare "that league was a democratic code. No class distinction could enter if the game was to progress. He paid tribute to the great work of the ladies’ committees, whose social activities during the year did much to aid the code". Mr. G. Grey Campbell, chairman of the control board, said "it was pleasing to note that there had been no incidents at Carlaw Park last year, and not a single senior player had come before the board for irregular conduct on the field. During the summer improvements had been made at Carlaw Park, and the system of flood lighting, which was so successful for sports events, would make night football possible". Tribute was paid to Ivan Culpan who had been secretary for the league for 20 years. During the meeting Archie Ferguson appealed for more senior matches to be played on outside grounds, particularly at the Devonport Domain with Mr. Campbell saying that the matter would be considered. Along with John A. Lee, four other members of parliament were also present, including Messrs, William Theophilus Anderton, Frederick William Schramm, Arthur George Osborne, and Arthur Shapton Richards who all "spoke of the success of the code in Auckland". The following officers were elected:- Patron, Mr. J.B. Donald; vice-patron, Mr. J.F.W. Dickson; president, Mr. John A. Lee, M.P.; vice presidents, Sir Ernest Davis, Messrs. R.D. Bagnall, R. Benson, J Donald, O. Blackwood, T.S. Bellamy, C. Drysdale, H. Grange, R.J. Laird, W.J. Lovett, E. Morton, E. Montgomery, T.G. Symonds, Joe Sayegh, C. Seagar, Frederick William Schramm M.P., W. Wallace, H. Walmsley, R.H. Wood, G.T. Wright, W.H. Brien, L. Coakley, H. Luke; trustees, Messrs. A. Stormont, Edward John Phelan, G. Grey Campbell; deputy-chairman, Edward John Phelan; club delegates, Messrs, F. McAneny, T. Davis, J.W. Probert, Jim Rukutai; chairman junior control board, Mr. D. Wilkie; auditor, Mr. R.A. Spinley; honorary physicians, Drs. M.G. Pezaro, F.J. Gwynne, K.H. Holdgate, J.N. Waddell, G.W. Lock, H. Burrell, W. Bridgman, S. Morris; board of control, Messrs. G. Grey Campbell (chairman), D. Wilkie, R. Doble, T. Davis, J.W. Probert, Jim Rukutai, J. McAneny, J.E. Knowling, and Ivan Culpan.

Annual ball
The Auckland Rugby League held their annual ball at the Peter Pan Cabaret on September 28. The Eastern Suburbs team which was touring Auckland at the time were honorary guests.

Auckland Rugby League life memberships

Jim Clark
Otahuhu nominated Jim Clark, who had recently been elected as returning president of their club as a life member of Auckland Rugby League. The league agreed and he was elected a life member of the ARL. It was stated that he "had been actively identified with the game for 25 years and had given much service as an official in the Otahuhu district for some years past. It was mentioned that Mr. Clark was an international, having twice played with New Zealand teams in Australia".

Frank Thompson
At the board of control meeting on June 22 Frank Thompson was made a life member. He joined the code in 1913 through the Remuera club. Thompson was an ex-member of the Referees’ Association for 17 years and spent 5 years on the grading, examination and appointment board. He also spent four years as a selector and six years with the junior management. Thompson was also a member of the New Zealand Referees’ Association for 10 years as a representative of the Auckland and the Northland leagues. He was also heavily involved in the acquisition and formation of Carlaw Park.

Rugby league ground allocation
On April 14 the Auckland Park and Reserves Committee met to allocate fields to the various winter codes. The chairman of the committee was Ted Phelan who was also on the Auckland Rugby League board. The fields allocated to rugby league were Cricket Ground (2), Outer Domain (1), Victoria Park (1), Walker Park (2), Western Springs (2), Grey Lynn Park (1), with ‘Stadium’ reserved. It was commented that there was a "spirit of harmony" between the codes.

George Gillett donated trophy
In June, former All Black and NZ rugby league international George Gillett, donated a "handsome silver cup to the Auckland Rugby League for any competition which the league may desire. The trophy was presented through Mr. H. Walmsley". It was decided during the season to award the trophy to the winner of the 4th grade competition which was ultimately City Rovers.

Papakura promoted to the Fox Memorial competition
At the annual meeting on March 23 it was announced that Papakura were being promoted from the Senior B grade which they had won comfortably for 2 years in a row to the Fox Memorial competition. Their backs would include Richard and A. Burgess, E Cossey, G Osborne, Phillips, J McInnes and Martin though it was said that their "strength will probably be in the forwards". While J Fogarty, D Evans, Buckeridge, C Ross, and Slater made a "good impression" in their preliminary match against Marist. It was rumoured that Cliff Satherley may also play for them. He didn't though former New Zealand representative Norm Campbell did play a handful of games to begin the season.

George Nepia joins Manukau
On March 10 it was reported that George Nepia would join the Manukau club. He would arrive in Onehunga later in March and would be accompanied by Tuhoro, who was "last year's outstanding forward for East Coast and Hawke's Bay". The Manukau team would be extremely strong with the selectors saying that their senior side would be selected from George Nepia, Jack Hemi, Rangi Chase, Angus Gault, Jack Brodrick, Walter Brimble, Tom Chase, Pita Ririnui, Jack Broughton, R. Wilson, McKinlay, Peter Mahima, Whye, Tuhoro (2), Kakau, Tane, and Phillips. It was then reported in late March that there were doubts that he would in fact play for Manukau however he ultimately did for a few weeks.

Senior team preseason and prospects
On March 26 several teams held organised practices with the Manukau side playing a South Auckland XIII at Waikaraka Park. Newton, Marist, City, and Ponsonby all practised at Carlaw Park while Richmond were at Grey Lynn Park. It was reported that Ponsonby were to be coached by Bill Davidson who was a past City Rovers player who also represented Auckland 14 times from 1920 to 1923 and New Zealand 16 times from 1919 to 1921.

It was reported that Richmond Rovers had erected a dressing and club rooms at Grey Lynn Park and that the senior team would be a strong one with Mervyn Devine joining the forwards. He was a Wellington Rugby representative. However Ted Mincham was transferring from Richmond to Mount Albert. They would still have the services of "Powell, Bickerton, and Wally Tittleton for their inside backs who know when others play well and W Tittleton is particularly clever at taking the gap and improving a movement for the men outside him. The form showed [after the preliminary games] by Mills and A Graham, two of the juniors can earn them permanent places in the senior team, [while] Furnell was the most improved full back in Auckland last season".

The Manukau side was considered to be shaping as "a very formidable team" with the "forwards particularly strong, and perhaps the heaviest ever seen in club football. The average weight will be nearly 14 stone. This should be a great season for Jack Brodrick, whose brilliant form in the Māori match against Australia last year, stamps him as the finest forward seen in the code for many years". They were also adding Pita Rurinui and "he should soon rise to All Black honours" according to the Auckland Star reporter. After their first preliminary game (which he did not play in) it was reported that Jack Hemi "expressed a desire to play for Ponsonby, but the transfer might cause some difficulty". After the match the Auckland Star said that Pita Ririnui "made a good impression on his first appearance and Brodrick, the best forward in Auckland last year, appears to be already in good form". Mahika Panapa, the North Auckland Rugby Maori representative halfback signed on to play for Manukau prior to their first Fox Memorial game. In mid May, J. Craig, a representative rugby player from Nelson arrived in Auckland to join the Manukau club. He had represented the combined Nelson-Golden Bay-Motueka-Marlborough side who played the Springboks in 1937.

Marist were reportedly gaining the services of Robert Grotte who was a former member and who had played as halfback for the St. George club in Sydney. After the first preliminary game they were said to be one of the strongest teams in the competition. "In Haslam they have one of the best pivotal players in Auckland and in Halsey and Midgley very speedy wings... Grotte, the former Sydney player looks like being certain of a place. In Anderson, Butler and Breed they have a fine trio of forwards.

Ponsonby would have a similar team to the previous season with a strong backline and the forwards strengthened by J. Fraser from Taranaki who was said to be a "splendid place-kick". They had virtually the same backline as in the previous season and had gained the services of Clark who was a "young player from Ellerslie [who had] the making of a good fullback.

Mount Albert were a suggested location for Bob Banham as they needed a "link between the rugged Mount Albert forwards and the inside backs, where the weakness lay last season". Ted Mincham joined Mount Albert from Richmond and "with McNeil and McCallum outside him the Mount Albert three-quarter line should be a bit of a problem for their opponents... [while] their forwards appear to be just as strong as last season". They were to be coached by former New Zealand player Stan Prentice. Following the first preliminary round of games at Carlaw Park on April 2 it was said that they "have a good solid pack of forwards and have an exceptional back in R. Burgess who has great dash and pace [and that they] will further strengthen their team for the competition matches. It is probable that they will gain Lilburn, a good five eighths from Hunua. McRobbie, the Pokeno forward, while there is a possibility that Cliff Satherley, the former Richmond and Mount Albert forward will lead the pack. In mid May it was reported that Mount Albert had signed R.F. Ball who was a member of the Eastern Suburbs club in Sydney.

Newton had had a relatively poor 1937 season though they had improved as the season went on. They had retained the services of Wilfred Brimble and Ted Brimble, and Crooks. While "Kendall, a full back from North Auckland showed promise", they also had a "fairly good pack of forwards who stuck to their work well in the preliminary match".

City were said after the first preliminary game to "not appear to be exceptionally strong, and they will miss both Hawea Mataira and Donald, who were their best forwards last year. However, Hutchinson's form at the base of the scrum is excellent, Cyril Wiberg can be relied upon to gather points consistently with accurate goal kicking and the forwards may shake down into a solid combination".

North Shore were said to have a young team. With "much interest taken in the appearance of Verdun Scott, whose cricket deeds are so well known. Scott played full back last season and is also a promising centre three-quarter". Jack Smith who made a good impression at five eighths, is again available. Zane and Rhodes, of last years team, will also be playing. The forwards will include Simpson, Souter, Hunt and players from lower grades.

Sprigs
It was decided to appoint a special committee to inspect players boots on Saturday's after St John Ambulance staff complained about injuries received by two players as the result of dangerous sprigs following the April 2 matches. The committee to inspect the boots each Saturday would be made up of Messrs. Mincham, Probert, and McAneny.

Injury substitutions
At the June 8 meeting of the control board the Referees’ Association said that they would "appreciate a ruling in regard to replacements". There was a suspicion that "a certain club had a player who came late, but another player conveniently "became injured" to allow the late player to enter play". While at a different game a player left the field stating he had influenza, while other cases where players had gone "off without advising the referee". Mr Campbell agreed that if a player was not seriously injured then they or the team captain should report to the referee before a replacement can be made. And that "a referee would be entitled to hold a game up to get a report from an ambulance man or doctor if there was ground for believing that injury was being shammed". It was then decided that a committee consisting of the chairman and Messrs. D. Wilkie and W. Mincham would submit a recommendation.

Junior football changes
At a meeting of the junior management board on February 8 several suggestions were discussed in regards to changes that could be made for the 1938 season. The main changes suggested were a proposal to reduce the age limit for the 6th grade to 18 years, introducing an age limit of 19.5 years for the 5th grade, and starting an open grade for the "first juniors, with a weight limit of 11st 7lb [73 kg], to obviate the need for two sections in the third grade". At their annual meeting on March 8 the proposals were debated and it was eventually decided to adopt them. Additional ones included that the age limit for the 6th grade be 18 and for the 7th grade be 16. The season would start for juniors on April 30.

Richmond club rooms opened at Grey Lynn Park

In early May the Richmond club applied to celebrate the opening of their clubrooms at Grey Lynn Park on June 4 by holding a match with South Auckland on its bye date. On June 4 they were officially opened by Mr. J.A. Lee prior to a game against a combined team from Huntly. Lee said "this is going to be a permanent home, and it is an object worthy of the highest praise". While Joe Sayegh said that the Richmond club had "done yeoman service in the interests of the players. He was pleased to say that the City Council was only too pleased to encourage similar buildings on other public properties". Mr. Swift expressed the club's thanks to Mr. Ralph Jenkinson who supervised the building construction.

Lawson Park developed

It was announced in mid March that Lawson Park would be developed. It would involve "earthworks of which will take from four to five months to complete. After this stage both areas have to be grassed and other finishing touches added". It had been started four years earlier "as a means of creating work in the district for the local unemployed, but was halted when sustenance was introduced. Some months ago work was recommenced, giving work for 20 men. When it is finished, it will provide two basketball [better known as netball at this time] and two tennis courts on a higher level, and on the lower part a rugby or rugby league football ground". It was said that "to provide for the football ground, a good deal of excavation will be necessary, so that ultimately a fine, natural grandstand will be secured". Twenty nine years later, in 1967 the New Lynn Rugby League club was established and Lawson Park became its home ground with their club rooms being built there.

Auckland representative team
In March the Auckland Rugby League board of control offered the Auckland representative coaching position to Bob Banham, the New South Wales representative five-eighths. A cable was received back from him accepting the position and he was expected to arrive in time for the matches on April 8. The board intended to place Banham in a local team "for playing purposes". It was reported that he had been unlucky to miss out on selection in the 1937 Australian team which toured England and he had also turned down an offer to coach Queensland. In early march it was decided to place Banham in the North Shore Albions side for six weeks and then review the placement. After six matches for North shore it was decided to leave him there for 3 more weeks before moving to and coaching the City team. Bert Avery, Hec Brisbane, and A Renwick were appointed selectors for Auckland for the season while Brisbane was nominated by Auckland to be one of the three selectors for the North Island side.

Obituary

George Seagar (snr)
In August George Seagar died aged 73. He had two sons who both represented New Zealand, George Seagar and Allan Seagar. George senior was a strong supported of rugby league and was an original vice-president of the Auckland Rugby League. He was later made a life member in recognition of his services to the game. He was survived by a wife, seven sons and three daughters, with 25 grandchildren and one great grandchild.

Eastern Suburbs Tour
In September/October the NSWRFL runner up Eastern Suburbs side toured Auckland. They played four matches against Marist Old Boys, Manukau, Richmond Rovers, and South Auckland. Their only loss was in the match against Richmond who had accumulated a remarkable record against touring Australian club teams.

Marist v Eastern Suburbs
J. Woods for Marist broke his leg in the second half. Marist was captained by Reginald Haslam.

Manukau v Eastern Suburbs
Jack Hemi was unavailable for Manukau due to illness while they lost Jack Brodrick to a shoulder injury during the first half.

Richmond v Eastern Suburbs

South Auckland v Eastern Suburbs

Senior first grade competitions

Preliminary round
Mervyn William Devine, the former Wellington rugby representative made his debut for the Richmond team.

Fox Memorial standings

Fox Memorial results
Marist won the competition when they defeated Newton in the final round. Had they lost there would have been a three-way tie for first with themselves, Mount Albert, and Newton all on 22 points from 11 wins each but their 10–7 win saw them outright winners with 12 wins and 4 losses. A key to their win was their defence which saw them only concede 121 points from 16 games, an average of less than 8 points per game. From round 7 until round 18 their points conceded was 8, 7, 2, 4, 3, 8, 0, 0, 4, 11, and 7.

Round 1
Papakura played in their first ever Fox Memorial game in round 1. They lost a close match 17–14 against Richmond. In the match between Newton and Manukau the referee (J. Cottingham) was knocked out after a ball which had been kicked struck him in the face from point blank range. Percy Rogers who was waiting to referee the following match took over and refereed the last 10 minutes. Rangi Chase was forced to leave the field with a shoulder injury.

Round 2

Round 3
Three players were sent off in the Manukau-Marist match as a result of an "on field incident". Jack Whye of Manukau was suspended for a week, J Breed of Marist was "severely reprimanded", while W Glover also of Marist was unable to attend the disciplinary hearing and was ordered to stand down until able to attend. In the match between City and Ponsonby, D Black of Ponsonby broke his knee cap and was ruled out for the season. They also lost P Young, and Frank Halloran to injuries during the match. They had previously lost former Kiwi Arthur Kay to a leg injury in an earlier match.

Round 4
Richmond defeated North Shore after a late try awarded after an obstruction. However the referee allowed the ball carrier to run behind the posts with the conversion taken from in front. The rules stated that the kick should have been taken from inline with where the obstruction occurred. The league ordered the match to be replayed if required later in the season. As it turned out the match did not need to be replayed as it would have no bearing on the championship. Bob Banham had to retire during the match after receiving a cut above the eye after colliding with an opponent which required three stitches. Arthur McInnarney scored his first senior points for Mt Albert. He would be selected for New Zealand in 1939.

Round 5

Round 6
A highlight of the round was the debut appearance of George Nepia for Manukau in their win over Richmond. It was said that he had a "sound game" but did not look match fit. Pita Ririnui was sent off for Manukau and Alf Broadhead for Richmond near the end of the game for fighting. They were both severely cautioned by the control board with Broadhead warned that a similar offence would be dealt with more severely. Also during the match Jack Brodrick went off to have a dislocated finger attended to. When he came back on he found that he had been replaced and so referee Maurice Wetherill made him leave the field once more. A notable feature in the North Shore – Papakura game was that a total of 10 penalty goals were kicked. The goal kicking in the senior grade was arguably the strongest it has ever been with John Anderson, Jack Hemi, Jack Smith, and J McInnes kicking a large number of goals most weeks.

Round 7
New Zealand representatives, Jack and Dick Smith were both absent for North Shore after their father passed away during the week. Bob Banham had been moved by the Auckland Rugby League from the North Shore club to City Rovers where he played for the remainder of the season.

Round 8
Papakura recorded their first ever win in the Fox Memorial competition with an 18–15 win over Manukau on Carlaw Park 2. Manukau were missing several of their best players who were on the New Zealand tour of Australia but still fielded a strong side. During the match Richard Burgess of Papakura fractured his left arm. Reginald Haslam was ordered off for Marist in their 13–7 win over Ponsonby. Ernie Pinches scored a try for Mt Albert in his first season for them. He had been born in England in 1914 before moving to New Zealand. He became well known for wrestling, holding the New Zealand light heavyweight title for 6 years in the 1950s. In the same decade he was elected to the Mt Roskill Borough Council. He was deputy mayor there from 1974 to 1987 and acting mayor from 1987 to 1988.

Round 9
In the match between Papakura and Mount Albert, the Papakura player Dobbyn had his nose broken. He was able to return to play a week later however.

Round 10
The Papakura – Richmond match was played at Prince Edward Park in Papakura. The scores were level 10–10 in the second half when both A Burgess and Crocker left the field injured leaving Papakura with just 11 players. Richmond went on to win 16–10.

Round 11

Round 12
Prime Minister, Michael Joseph Savage was a guest of the Auckland Rugby League and came to Carlaw Park to watch some of the play. He was accompanied by president John .A. Lee and along with his party was "entertained at an afternoon tea organised by the ladies’ social committee". L Cootes of Ponsonby was ordered off for striking a City opponent. In the same match Turi Albert Macpherson broke his leg when he collided with a Ponsonby forward.

Round 13
During the Mount Albert – Marist game Arthur McInnarney and MacLachlan collided while trying to field a kick which allowed Marist to score a try giving them the lead. McInnarney had to leave the field with an injured leg as a result of the collision. In the Richmond game with North Shore six players had to leave the field with injuries. North Shore had to play two short in the second half. Dick Smith and Verdun Scott were amongst those who had to go off, along with Powell. During the week Richmond lost the services of Frank Furnell who transferred to Wellington. He was replaced at fullback by Trevor Bramley.

Round 14

Round 15
Laurie Mills (aged 20) was concussed in the Richmond – Manukau game and was taken to hospital. He would later be killed in action during World War 2. In the Marist game with City Bob Banham went off injured in the first half for City, while Jackie Rata and Jackson went off in the second half. Remarkably in the North Shore v Papakura match the referee was Ted Mincham who had spent the first half of the season playing for Mount Albert seniors. He would surely have been one of the only players ever to play and referee in the same competition during a season. He would however play senior football again for Richmond during the war years.

Round 16
Richard Shadbolt was sent off for Mount Albert during the first half of their match with Manukau. They also lost C Dunne and A MacLachlan through injuries meaning that for nearly 30 minutes they had to play with just 10 men.

Round 17
The Auckland match against Canterbury was played on the same day at Carlaw Park with the club matches providing the curtain-raisers. Richmond and Manukau did not play on the day and the Auckland team was made exclusively from their teams. In the match between Mount Albert and City, Jack Tristram and Bob Banham were ordered off from each team respectively after an incident between them.

Round 18
By virtue of their win over Newton, Marist claimed the Fox memorial title for 1938. Roy Hardgrave made an appearance for Mount Albert after recently returning to Auckland from his time playing professionally in England and France.

Roope Rooster (knockout competition)

Round 1

Round 2
In the match between North Shore and Marist, H Simpson (North Shore), K Finlayson (Marist), and J Woods (Marist) were all sent from the field.

Semi finals

Final

Phelan Shield

Round 1
In the Mount Albert match with Marist, Joseph Gunning and Richard Shadbolt were both sent off for Mount Albert and William Grotte was sent off for Marist.

Round 2
In addition to the 2 Phelan Shield matches Marist played Ponsonby in a practice game on the No. 2 field as preparation for their match against the touring Eastern Suburbs side, while Ponsonby was still in the Phelan Shield and preparing for their semi-final match. Marist won 20 points to 14.

Semi final

Final

Stormont Shield (champion of champions)
During the match 21 year old Maurice Potter of the Richmond side was concussed and taken to hospital though his condition was reported to not be serious. He was replaced by Frank Furnell who had returned from Wellington.

Top try scorers and point scorers
The point scoring lists are compiled from matches played in the Fox Memorial, Roope Rooster, Phelan Shield and Stormont Shield matches which all first grade sides were eligible for competing in (provided they avoided elimination from the knock out competitions). The top point scorer for the third consecutive season was John Anderson with 82. Jack Hemi (Manukau) and J McInnnes (Papakura) finished with 78, while Jack Smith had 60. Anderson, Hemi, and Smith all went on the New Zealand tour of Australia mid-season which meant they missed 6 Fox Memorial games so their point totals were significantly below than what they would have been.

Senior reserve competitions
The early round results were not reported while several later rounds also only had sporadic reporting. Richmond and Mount Albert were tied after 18 rounds necessitating a final between the two teams which Richmond won by 16 points to 10.

Norton Cup standings
{|
|-
|

Norton Cup results
In the opening round match between Mount Albert and Ponsonby at Grey Lynn, Norman Drew fractured his ankle.

Senior reserve final

Stallard Cup (knockout competition)

Senior B grade competitions

Sharman Cup standings
{|
|-
|

Sharman Cup results
The round 1 match between Otahuhu and Point Chevalier at Walker Park was called off by the referee with Otahuhu in the lead by 25 points to 13. The match was awarded to Otahuhu with Point Chevalier's approval. Manukau entered a team after round 1 but they defaulted their round 2 match against Ellerslie (this match was then removed from the records) and then withdrew from the competition.

Otahuhu won the competition and their final round match was against Green Lane (who finished runner up) at Carlaw Park on July 16. The match was a curtain-raiser to the Auckland – New Zealand match. Not all of the results were reported in the newspapers however at the conclusion of the competition the Auckland Star reported that the teams finished on the following competition points: Otahuhu 19, Green Lane 14, Ellerslie 12, Point Chevalier 7, Northcote 6, R.V. 2.

Walmsley Shield (knockout competition)
Due to the amount of time left in the season following the conclusion of the Sharman Cup it was decided to play a full home and away competition for the Walmsley Shield. Very few results were reported and Point Chevalier dropped out of the competition after round 6. Ellerslie won the competition.

Other club matches and lower grades

Senior club matches

Manukau v South Auckland XIII
In a preseason match Manukau played a South Auckland XIII at Waikaraka Park in Onehunga. Neither George Nepia or Jack Hemi played in the match but Manukau won a "fast and interesting contest".

Canterbury B v Newton

Huntly v Ponsonby

Newton v Canterbury

ARL Referees Association v South Auckland Referees Association (Kiwi Cup)

Whangarei v North Shore

Lower grade competitions
Richmond won the Davis Shield for the most championship points in all grades which they had won for several consecutive years, while Otahuhu won the Tracy Inglis trophy for most points in the junior grades.
It was decided to substitute the Hospital Cup for the fourth grade championship with the Gillett Cup which had been presented to the league by George A. Gillett earlier in the season. It was noted by the chairman of the schools’ committee, Mr. A.E. Stanley at the end of the season at the final control board meeting that "eight years ago there were seven school teams in Auckland, while in the season just closed there were 41 teams in the three grades".

In the third grade Richmond and North Shore won their respective sections and then played each other home and away to decide the championship. Richmond won 8-2 and then 8–3 to win the title. Richmond won the seventh grade knockout competition when they beat City 15–5 in the final.

Grades were made of the following teams with the winning team in bold: 
Third Grade: Avondale, Glenora, North Shore, Northcote & Birkenhead Ramblers, Point Chevalier, Ponsonby United, R.V., Richmond Rovers
Fourth Grade (George Gillett Cup): City Rovers, Ellerslie United, Glenora, Manukau, Mount Albert United, North Shore Albions, Otahuhu Rovers (knockout winner), Papakura, R.V., Richmond Rovers 
Fifth Grade: City Rovers, Ellerslie United, Green Lane (runner up), Mount Albert United, North Shore Albions, Northcote, Papakura, Point Chevalier, Richmond Rovers
Sixth Grade: Avondale, Marist Old Boys, Newton Rangers, Otahuhu Rovers, Ponsonby United, Richmond Rovers (knockout winners)
Seventh Grade: City Rovers, Ellerslie United, Glenora, Manukau, North Shore Albions, Papakura, Point Chevalier, Richmond Rovers (knockout winner) 
Schoolboys
Senior (Lou Rout trophy): Avondale, Glenora, Green Lane, Mount Albert United, Newton Rangers, Northcote & Birkenhead Ramblers, Otahuhu Rovers, Point Chevalier, Ponsonby United, Richmond Rovers (knockout winner – Stanley Cup)
Intermediate (Newport and Eccles Memorial Shield): Avondale, Balmoral, Ellerslie United, George Court's, Newton Rangers, Northcote & Birkenhead Ramblers, North Shore Albions,  Point Chevalier, Ponsonby United, Richmond Rovers, St Patricks A, St Patricks B
Junior: Avondale, Balmoral, Ellerslie, George Court's, Glenora, Green lane, Manukau, Marist Old Boys, Mount Albert United, Napier Street, Newton Rangers, Northcote & Birkenhead Ramblers, Point Chevalier, Ponsonby United (won gala day knockout), Richmond Rovers, St Patricks
A schoolboy gala was held at Carlaw Park on the 22nd of October. Competing teams in the 7-a-side tournament were St. Patricks, George Court's (2), Ellerslie (2), Richmond, Ponsonby, Green Lane, Point Chevalier, Balmoral, Northcote, Manukau, Newton, Glenora, and Marist. The team from Ponsonby won the knockout competition when they defeated Ellerslie in the final. Ponsonby were presented with the Robert Reid Memorial Shield for winning the championship during the year, and the Wilson trophy for their knockout tournament win. The most improved 7-a-side player was named as J. Stackpole from Newton. The J. Gedye Cup went to S. Callagher of Richmond, while D. White of Ponsonby won the Don Cleverley Medal. The Marist team was presented with medals by Mr. C.L.M. Green, while J. Scott of the North Shore side was presented with the Sam Dickie Cup for goalkicking in the intermediate grade.

Representative Fixtures

Auckland v Rest of North Island

North Island v South Island (inter-island match)
Brian Riley was initially named to play for the North Island side but as he was unable to get leave from work to potentially tour Australia if selected he was replaced in the North Island side.

Probables v Possibles
The Possibles team led 19–0 at halftime and so the selectors switched the forwards and three players who had started in the Possibles side scored points for the Probables in the second half (Bert Leatherbarrow, John Anderson, and Bill McNeight).

Auckland Māori (Tamaki) v Auckland Pākehā
During the match 24 year old Joseph Alva Gunning received a kick to the head and went to Auckland Hospital with concussion. It was said that his condition was not serious however the New Zealand Herald reported two weeks later that he had only recently been discharged from hospital with the intention of playing in the upcoming weekend match for Mount Albert though he ultimately didn't return until their July 2 match.

Auckland v New Zealand

Auckland v Canterbury

Auckland representative matches played and scorers

Auckland Pākehā representative matches played and scoring

Auckland Māori (Tāmaki) representative season
Auckland Māori only played one match during the season. The club competition ran much longer than it had in previous seasons and the New Zealand side went on a mid season tour of Australia meaning that there were relatively few opportunities for representative matches. On June 6 they played an Auckland Pākehā side at Carlaw Park and won 26 to 21.

Tāmaki (Auckland Māori) representative matches played and scorers

Annual general meetings and club news
Auckland Rugby League Junior Management Committee At the junior control board annual meeting on March 8 Mr. D. Wilkie presided. The following board was elected: Messrs. W. Berger, E. Chapman, C. Howe, J. Stonex, A. Hopkinson, E. McNamara, D. Wilkie, F. Kennedy, R. Short. On April 12 at their board meeting they set April 22 as the final day for nominations for the junior grades with a tentative start date for games on April 30.

Auckland Rugby League Referees Association held their annual meeting in early March. The retiring secretary Mr. Wilfred Simpson was made a life member of the association. The following officers were elected:- President, Mr. Les Bull; vice-president Mr. J.G. McCowatt; hon. secretary Mr. T.E. Skinner; treasurer Mr. A. Chapman; auditor Mr. Percy Rogers; delegates, A.R.L., Mr. M. Renton, N.Z. Referees’ Association Mr. Les Bull, representative grading committee, Messrs. Maurice Wetherill, Percy Rogers, R Otto. On March 28 at a meeting the Referees Association received a letter from the control board advising them that Mr. R.H. Benson had been reappointed as their representative on their board with Mr T. Davis as deputy. On April 4 M. Renton resigned as delegate to the junior management. He along with A. Sanders were then elected as the grading and examination committee with Les Bull nominated as third man on the appointments board, subject to approval by the control board. At their final meeting of the year on October 3 Percy Rogers announced that he was retiring from active refereeing. He thanked Messrs. Leslie Edgar Bull, McCowatt, and Arthur Ball. Tribute was paid to president Bull for "his able chairmanship and guidance in administrative matters". Thanks was also said to Messrs. A. McCowatt, William Mincham, J. Short, T.E. Skinner, and Arthur Rae. On the day of the Stormont Shield final which Percy Rogers refereed he was presented with a blazer. He had been a prominent referee for 16 years and refereed many international matches. Mr. F.H. Whitman who had cared for traveling teams was presented with a travelling outfit.
Avondale League Football Club In June Avondale advised the ARL junior management board that it had decided to form a junior officers’ club, to collaborate with the Auckland Rugby League in "any matters for the good of the game". In late June the Avondale league clubs football ladies’ committee held a "highly successful" dance at the Oddfellows’ Hall. The dance hall and supper room were decorated in the club's colours. They held a dance at the Oddfellow's Hall in early October in honour of a visiting team from Whangarei. The venue was decorated in the colours of both clubs. The programme "consisted of new and old time dances and items from Māori members of the Northern team. The visitors were welcomed by the chairman, Mr. L. Hulhman, and Mr. Dunkley, secretary of the Northland league". On December 10 Avondale held their annual picnic at Tui Glen in Henderson with 150 present.

City Rovers held a practice on March 12 at Carlaw Park. They were advertising for "vacancies for players in all grades, and applications are invited". They held their annual picnic on Motuihe Island on October 9, departing central Auckland at 9:30 on board the Baroona. Over 500 members and supporters attended. Trophies were presented to D. Hutchinson who was the most consistent player (C. Haynes’ Cup), and E. McCarthy for training attendance for the reserve grade side. E. Wehner and Jack Rata were tied for honours for senior training and general merit. Wehner received a medal from Mr. W. Johnson and Rata received the club medal. Their fourth grade team was presented with the G. Gillett Cup for winning the championship, and the Raynes Cup for the most club championship points. Other individual awards presented were: (Third Grade) First try of the season, J. Sullivan; most improved player, E. Grey; most improved uniform, A. Bain; control of fourth team, A. Mitchell. (Fifth Grade) most consistent player, R. Robinson; best behaved, Leslie Beehre. (Seventh grade) best back, J. Hubbard; best forward, E. Purdy; behaviour, L. Pell; most improved, J. Tuki; most improved forward, D. McCormack; and most consistent, J. Haora. Trophies were donated by Messrs. Morrison, Glover, F.H. Whitham, C.E. Johnston, Farley, B. Messenger, and W. Roff.

Ellerslie United Rugby League Club held their annual meeting in early March. Their report made mention of the 3rd grade team which won the knock-out competition. The 4th grade side was runner-up in the championship, while the schoolboys seven-a-side team was only defeated once. They stated that they were in a "satisfactory financial position". Cups were presented to J. McArthur who was the best back in the club, and Ernie Pinches, the best forward. Both players were members of the 3rd grade team. The following officers were elected:-  Patron, Mr. Arthur Osborne, M.P.; president, Mr. J. McInnarney; vice-presidents, Messrs, R.H. McIsaac, J. Court, A. Chapman, A. McKenzie, C. Clarke, Carver, Whelan, R. Cameron; club captain, Mr. F. Chapman; secretary and treasurer, Mr. George Whaley; auditors, J. Carr, O.D. Slye; committee, Messrs, J. Wilson (chairman), A. Strong, R. Hunter, A Tobin, S. Pemberton, C. Pemberton, R. Boss, C. Tucker, W. Miller, H. Thomas, H. Johnson, J. Pinches, M. Campbell. They held their annual picnic at Point England.

Rugby league in Manurewa. On March 22 rugby league and rugby union both made claims to use the grounds at Jellicoe Park to the Manurewa Borough Council. Rugby league asked for use of the ground on alternate Saturdays for its 28 registered players in the area while rugby officials said "they were solely dependent upon the facilities for the 39 players on their books". The Mayor Mr. W.J. Ferguson said "he had hoped the two codes would have been able to arrange matters amicably. The council had to weigh equitably the claims of the community. It was decided to offer the codes equal use of the park and to make a charge of 10/6 each playing day. It was suggested that a senior match should be arranged for each Saturday".
 
Marist Brothers Old Boys League Football Club held their annual meeting on March 10 at 7.45pm at the Auckland Rugby League Rooms. The club's secretary Mr. Joe Sayegh congratulated the senior team on their success after they missed out on the championship by one competition point, but won the Roope Rooster trophy and Stormont Shield. The balance sheet reportedly showed a "substantial credit balance". The following officers were elected:- Patron, His Lordship Bishop Liston; president, Mr. Joe Sayegh; vice-presidents, same as last year; secretary Jack Kirwan; honorary treasurer, Mr. P. Fletcher; committee, Messrs J. Ball, W. Maddigan, Fraser Hudson Webberley, George Copas, P. Hughes. On October 29 they held their annual prize giving with over 300 members and supporters present. ARL chairman, G. Grey Campbell presented the club with the Fox Memorial Shield, and the Thistle Cup for the most points in the second round. Individual and team prizes went to McLeod (most improved player), Stanaway (most conscientious at training), third grade: McWilliams and Hughes, sixth grade: Sydney Bracegirdle. R.L. Haslam was presented with a handbag in recognition of his services to the club. He had announced his retirement but club president Joe Sayegh said he hoped he would still be available for the following season. The club then issued its new official badges which were a shamrock with the title initials on green petals over a gold background.

Manukau Rugby League Club In mid February, Manukau secured Pita Ririnui from Tauranga to play for them. He was a former rugby representative player who had played for the combined Poverty Bay-East Coast-Bay of Plenty against the Springboks in Gisborne in 1937. The South African captain Philip Nel had said that he was one of the best forwards that they had met on the tour of Australia and New Zealand. Ririnui was "6ft 1in in height, weighs 16st, and is 22 years of age". It was also reported that T, Kakau a sizeable rugby back was also moving to Auckland. A special meeting of players was to be held at Onehunga on February 28. They held practice matches against visiting teams from the Lower Waikato on March 26. Two junior sides would play teams from Ngaruawahia, while the senior team would play South Auckland (Waikato). The matches would be played at Waikaraka Park. In late November the council the Onehunga Borough Council turned down Manukau's application to lease Gloucester Park. The ground was formerly known as Geddes Basin and had been drained in 1934 before being transformed into a sports ground. It had laid idle for three years. Mr. N.A. Ching wrote to the council on behalf of the Manukau club offering to lease the ground for 10 years at a rental of £25 a year with the right of further renewal, and a further £25 a year if the lease of a cottage was included. They also undertook to spend "at least £100 a year on improvements and buildings". However Mr. W.J. Moore of the council was of the opinion that "it was inadvisable at the present time to grant a lease of Gloucester Park, in view of its future potentialities, and on his motion this course was adopted.

Mount Albert United Rugby League Football Club Their annual meeting was held on February 28. The club was reported to be in a "sound financial position". There were a number of new players registering with the club which indicated "a very successful season" on offer. It was decided to begin training immediately. The following officers were elected:- Patron, the mayor of Mount Albert; vice-patron, Mr. Arthur Shapton Richards, M.P.; president, Mr. A.C. Gallagher; vice-presidents, same as last year with power to add; hon. secretary, Mr. H.G. Shaw; hon. treasurer, Mr. William Edmund Schultz; club captain, Mr. F. Martin, hon. auditor, Mr. S.C. Johnston. In mid October they held their annual prize giving at the Manchester Unity Hall. Prizes were given to best club schoolboy, I. Garrett; best club member (annual), C. Allan; schoolboy coaching services, A. Jenkinson. Senior grade: Most improved player, A. McLaughlan; most consistent forward, Richard Seddon Shadbolt, reserve grade: back, C. Renton; forward (annual), C. Callinan; annual 100 yards championship for C. Elwin Memorial Cup, and for coaching services, Claude List; goal kicking, E. Cranch; consistent forward, F. List, Third grade: Best all-rounder, M Haswell; back, J Mens; forward, W. Stewart; improved player A. Chiswell. Fifth grade: back, W. Carter; good conduct, James Seath; improved back, R. Hogan; improved forward, P. Lenihan, Schoolboys: Improved player, N. Clark: best dressed (seven-a-side), D. Greenhalgh: coaching services, N. Lake.

Newton Rangers Football Club It was reported in July that former player Roy Hardgrave was returning to New Zealand after playing for York and Toulouse. J. Lee, an Australian was taken on as their senior coach.

North Shore Albions held their annual meeting on March 9 at the Labour Hall in Devonport at 8pm.
Northcote and Birkenhead Ramblers Football Club were granted the use of Stafford Park on "the usual terms to the Northcote Ramblers League Football Club for matches and practice".  On June 28 at the meeting of the junior management committee they read a letter from Northcote advising that their secretary, Mr. Andrew Borrows was having to resign owing to his departure from Auckland. Mr. J. Evans had been appointed in his place. On August 23 Northcote asked for permission to send their senior B team to visit Whangarei the following Saturday.

Otahuhu Rovers Rugby League Football Club Otahuhu elected the following officers at its annual meeting in early March: Patron, Mr. H.F. Clements; president, Mr. C Hill; last years vice presidents were re-appointed with additions hon. secretary Owen McManus; treasurer C.F. Clarke; committee Messrs W. Clinton, W. Gordon, C. Dunne, C. Kelly, A Porteous, W. Hart, I Auckram, A. Pond; captains, Messrs R. Roud and B. McDonald. Their report stated that the third and fifth grades won their respective titles and were runners up in the knockout competitions. While the schoolboys team was runner up in its grade". In late March Otahuhu applied for permission to train on Sturges Park on Thursday evenings to the Otahuhu Borough Council. The Otahuhu Rugby Club applied for permission to train at Sturges Park on Tuesday and Thursday nights and to be able to use the ground on Saturday afternoons until the season opened. The matter was referred to the parks committee. In mid August John Nicholson passed away aged 80. He was the president of Otahuhu for many years. Otahuhu nominated a team to enter the Roope Rooster competition in August. They also asked to stage a special match as a benefit for the Otahuhu Free Kindergarten. As the draw had already been made for the Roope Rooster competition the league suggested they nominate a team for the Stallard Cup which was competed for by the senior reserve teams.

Papakura Rugby League Football Club At their annual meeting on March 3 they made special note of the excellent record of their senior side which won the senior B grade. They only lost one match out of 18 and won the Foster Memorial Shield, the Sharman Cup, and the Walmsley Shield. Their membership for 1937 totalled 133 with 12 honorary members which was a record for the club. Mr. R. Walsh presented the balance sheet which showed that the club had a credit balance of £117 1s 3d which was £30 more than the year before despite having some heavy expenses including £83 for transport. The club patron, Mr. H.A. Pollock presented the club with a new set of jerseys. The following officers were elected:- Patron, Mr. Hugh Arnold Pollock; president, Mr. L. McVeigh; vice-presidents, Messrs. C. Chamberlain, William James Davidson Jack, Sydney Herbert Godden, Francis Verner; treasurer, R. Walsh; club captain, F. Osborne; auditor, J. Beans; committee, Messrs, A. McDonald, G. Wilson, William Cornthwaite, P. Hammond, V. Ashby, I. Wilson, Norman Widdowson, E. Searle, J. Ansley; grounds committee, A. Schawtfeger, J. McVeigh, R. Bates, F. Barnes, F. Maddren, D. Watts. Papakura applied for the use of Prince Edward Park for the season. The Papakura Board granted use of the park until its term expired, and advised the club to make an application again to the new borough council, for definite terms of tenure and rental. At the Papakura Town Board meeting Mr. D. Weir said "we should definitely give the club an incentive to do something for itself at Prince Edward Park by allowing it to have a longer lease of say a few years if that could be arranged". On the 11th of April the Papakura Board granted the use of Prince Edward Park and its floodlighting for the football season. The Papakura club invited Frank Osborne, their club captain to stand as an independent candidate for the Papakura Borough Council. He was employed at the time as an engine driver for New Zealand Railways. He was also the president of the Amateur Athletic Club. It was reported Papakura had a strong connection with athletics through its players. The New Zealand Herald stated that "C. Osborne, one of the three-quarters, has built up a fine athletic record this season, competing at meetings conducted by the Papakura, Manurewa, Papatoetoe, Otahuhu and Pukekohe clubs. J. Fogarty and D. Evans, two well-built forwards, whose stamina and speed impressed on Saturday, have also had successes at these meetings. T.R. Burgess has been prominent in the Otahuhu Clubs events during the past two years, while Ewan Cossey, the halfback, has been placed in 100 yards events at Papakura in the past month. They notified the league that in early July Messrs. Sydney Herbert Godden and A. Schwartfeger had replaced Messrs E. Searle, and H. Widdowson respectively on its executive. In October Papakura celebrated their season at the Windsor Theatre with officials from the Auckland Rugby League and members of the Eastern Suburbs touring side. On November 27, Papakura held their third annual picnic with 500 in attendance at Mr. J. McNicol's property at Clevedon.

Point Chevalier League Football Club They were granted permission to hold a club day at Walker Park on June 25 where all their teams would play there. The day was in aid of the St John Ambulance Association.

Ponsonby United Football Club They held their annual meeting on February 28. Their report stated that the success of their junior teams was "outstanding" with the schoolboy intermediate team winning the championship by scoring 304 points and having none registered against it". They also listed their nine senior players who gained representative honours. They thanked their president Mr. A. Adams for donating medals and caps to the schoolboys team while a trophy donated by Mr. A. Barnett was awarded to Frank Halloran for the best sportsman in the club. The following officers were elected:- Patron, Mr. W. Grant; president Mr. J. Arnell; hon. secretary, Mr. W. Grieves; hon. treasurer, Mr. L. Adams.

Richmond Rovers Football Club held their 24th annual meeting in the Gaiety Hall in Grey Lynn on March 3 with Mr. B.W. Davis presiding before a "large attendance". At the opening of the meeting he requested that they stand in silence as a mark of respect to their patron, the late Mr. W.J. Holdsworth. Their report was satisfied with the club's success with ten grade teams and a seven-a-side Richmond was successful in winning the senior, senior reserve, 4th grade, and senior school championships. They once again won the Davis Points Shield which was open to all clubs for the most aggregate points in the junior grades. Mr. Ralph Jenkinson spoke about the various teams and then awarded the Harry Johns Memorial Cup to the senior reserve team. It was presented to their manager Mr. J. McGregor and their captain Mr. M. Metcalfe. The club also congratulated Harold Tetley, Wally Tittleton, Noel Bickerton, Jack Satherley, Jack McLeod, and George Mitchell on gaining New Zealand representative honours. The club was reported to be in a sound financial position. They elected the following officers:- Patron, Mr. J. Redwood; senior president, Mr. B.W. Davis; chairman, Mr. W.A. Swift; secretary and treasurer, Mr. W.R. Dick; delegate to primary schools’ management committee, Mr. E.J. McCarthy; club captain, Mr. Ralph Jenkinson, auditor, Mr. J.A. Redwood. Richmond held their annual picnic at Tui Glen in Henderson on December 11 with "about 450 members and friends attending". K. Fletcher was presented with the Warnock Points Shield for the year, while caps were presented to players in the championship winning sides which included the senior reserve team, the third grade, seventh grade, senior schoolboys and intermediate schoolboys.

Senior grade registration and transfers
On March 3 the following players were registered: Ian Mackenzie (ex King Country), and H.P.S. Walker (ex Queensland) to Mount Albert. Pita Ririnui and T Ririnui (Tauranga) and T Kakau to Manukau, and Ronald Beaumont Chesterman to North Shore Albions. On March 29 fifty new registrations were received while William Caples transferred from Point Chevalier to City Rovers seniors, and Ernie Pinches from Ellerslie to Mount Albert seniors. Twenty six player registrations were approved on March 30 with P Young being transferred from Newton Rangers to Ponsonby and J.J. Campbell formerly of Hikurangi being reinstated. Then on March 31 G.E. King of Newton Rangers transferred to Huntly, and Noel Messenger also of Newton transferred to Greymouth on the West Coast.

On April 6 R.A. Lush transferred from Richmond to Ponsonby reserves. J. Fraser had his transfer cleared from Western Suburbs, New Plymouth to Ponsonby. While Robert John Blakely, Thos Kelly, and Arthur Samuel Slater were reinstated. On April 13 William V.R. Smith transferred from Newton to North Shore, F Butler from Newton to Marist, Patrick Costello from Manukau senior reserves to North Shore, Thos Kelly from Manukau to Papakura, E. McNeil from Richmond to Ponsonby, Norm Campbell (player-coach) from Marist to Papakura, J.E. Pyke from Point Chevalier to Manukau, and J. Campbell from Point Chevalier to Ponsonby. J Hilton of South Auckland was cleared to play for Newton, W.G. Johnson (South Auckland to Newton), C. Preston (West Coast to Marist), E. Jones from Northland to Newton. I.N. Ibbertson was reinstated and transferred from Glenora senior B to Ponsonby. On April 19 Alan Jabez Watkins transferred from Mount Albert to Richmond, G Crocker transferred from Marist to Papakura and T Maher from R.V. senior B to City. Clarry McNeil had a clearance confirmed from Wellington to Mount Albert. On April 27 D.F. Harris was reinstated and transferred to Otahuhu.

On May 4 the following players were granted transfers:- R.P. Tatana, Manukau to City; A.J. Couper, Richmond senior B to Ponsonby seniors; R. McGreal, Marist to Ngaruawahia; Daniel Hourigan, Newton to Ponsonby; Arthur McInnarney, Ellerslie to Mount Albert. While J. Blackledge was cleared from Wellington to Auckland where he would join Northcote. On May 11 Steve Watene was transferred from Manukau to his old club, City Rovers, and a week later to Newton Rangers, while H.J. Collins was transferred from Newton to Mount Albert and C. Wilson from Marist reserves to Papakura. On May 18 G. Greenwood was transferred from Mount Albert to Richmond, and S Bickerton transferred from Mount Albert to Newton. On May 25 W. Mallinson from Waiutu, West Coast joined Manukau. C Meyer, the Northland representative player and brother of ex-international Ted Meyer applied to join the Papakura club. M.T. Nicholas was registered with Manukau and F. Anderson with Papakura.

On June 1 C Philp transferred from Manukau to Green Lane while B.F. Lee of Toowoomba transferred to Auckland to play for Newton pending approval from the New Zealand Council. Russell Harris was reinstated to Otahuhu. On June 22 F.J. Halpin (ex-Manawatu) and C. Greenwood (with clearance from Manukau) were registered with Newton, while Vincent Axman was registered with North Shore with clearance from City. W.W. Philp and Owen Noel Beer were reinstated. W. Cuff was transferred from Newton to Mount Albert. On June 29 L. Bramble (ex-Central Club in Wellington) was registered with the Newton club. W.L. Dorman transferred from Point Chevalier Senior B to Ponsonby. C.J. Montgomery was reinstated.

On July 7 Edgard Herbert Mervyn Tredrea transferred from Richmond 3rd grade to Newton.

On July 13 H.J. Collins was transferred from Manukau to Mount Albert, and W. Stockley from Ponsonby to Northcote. While F.J. Wells was registered with Ponsonby, C. Meredith with North Shore, and R. McInnarney with Mount Albert. On July 19 J. W. Stockley and F Halloran transferred from Ponsonby seniors to Northcote Senior B. On July 27 A Beyer, the former representative player from Northland, was regraded and transferred from Richmond to Ellerslie. He admitted to the committee that he had made an application to rugby to be reinstated but was refused. On August 9 T. Thompson was transferred from Manukau reserves to Ellerslie senior B. On August 17 R Jones was regraded to senior B and transferred to Otahuhu while J. Greenwood was reinstated to play for Richmond. On August 24 Roy Hardgrave was registered with Mount Albert, F Whittle to City, and Paul Meyer to North Shore.

On September 7 C. Ericksen was registered with Marist, W. Walker with Papakura (subject to a clearance from Taranaki), and G Rowlands from Newcastle in Australia to the City club, subject to approval by the New Zealand Council. A.J. Dufty was transferred from Point Chevalier second grade to City reserves.

References

External links
 Auckland Rugby League Official Site

Auckland Rugby League seasons